The 2018 Rink Hockey Continental Cup was the 38th season of the Continental Cup, Europe's roller hockey Super Cup, organized by the World Skate Europe - Rink Hockey.

Four teams from two federations played for the title on 29 and 30 September 2018 in Barcelos, Portugal.

Spanish club Barcelona achieved their eighteenth title ever.

Teams

Bracket

See also
World Skate Europe - all competitions

References

External links
 2018 Continental Cup at CERH website

Continental Cup (rink hockey)
Continental Cup